Gefyra ( meaning "bridge") is a settlement in the municipality of Megalopoli, Arcadia, Greece. It is situated near the right bank of the river Alfeios, 4 km south of Megalopoli and 5 km north of Leontari. Gefyra had a population of 30 in 2011. The Greek National Road 7 (Corinth - Tripoli - Kalamata) passes south of the village. There are large open-pit lignite mines to the northwest of the village. There are two beautiful churches: St. George in the village square, and St John at the eastern edge of the village.

History

On August 30th 1944, the village was attacked by Nazi troops that were stationed in the nearby village of Anthochori. 12 male inhabitants of the village were massacred on that dreadful day including the village priest. The heroic 12 are remembered by a marble monument in the village square next to the Church of St. George. Gefyra suffered damage from the 2007 Greek forest fires.

Population

See also

List of settlements in Arcadia

References 

Megalopolis, Greece
Populated places in Arcadia, Peloponnese